Good to Be Home is a 2014 album by Blu (rapper)

Good to Be Home may also refer to:
Good To Be Home, album by Paul Clark and Friends 1975 
"Good to Be Home", by Harry Connick, Jr. with Branford Marsalis; composed by Harry Connick, Jr. List of songs recorded by Harry Connick, Jr.